Domaháza is a village in Borsod-Abaúj-Zemplén County in northeastern Hungary.  it had a population of 903.

References

Populated places in Borsod-Abaúj-Zemplén County